Siege of Pamplona may refer to:

 Battle of Pampeluna (1521), a battle and siege in which Ignatius of Loyola was wounded
 Siege of Pamplona (1813), an operation during the Peninsular War
 Siege of Pamplona (1823), an action during the 1823 French invasion of Spain
 Siege of Pamplona (1874), an incident near the end of the First Spanish Republic